Chrysopaa is a genus of frogs in the family Dicroglossidae. It is monotypic, being represented by the single species, Chrysopaa sternosignata.  It is found in Balochistan, Pakistan, Kashmir (Pakistan and India) and in Afghanistan. Its common names include Baluch Mountain frog, karez frog, Malir paa frog, and Murray's frog.

Chrysopaa sternosignata is a highly aquatic frog living in rivers, swamps, and freshwater marshes. It is a relatively common species.

References

Dicroglossidae
Amphibians of Afghanistan
Frogs of India
Amphibians of Pakistan
Amphibians described in 1885
Taxa named by James A. Murray (zoologist)
Taxonomy articles created by Polbot